The Bachelorette is an American dating reality television series created for ABC by Mike Fleiss. It was originally hosted by Chris Harrison, and is now hosted by Jesse Palmer and is a spin-off of The Bachelor. The series is produced by Next Entertainment and Warner Horizon Television, and revolves around a single bachelorette who starts with a pool of romantic interests from whom she is expected to select a husband. During the course of the season, the bachelorette eliminates candidates, culminating in a marriage proposal from her final selection. The participants travel to romantic and exotic locations for their adventures, and the conflicts in the series, both internal and external, stem from the elimination-style format of the show.

 On March 15, 2021, ABC renewed the series for a seventeenth and eighteenth seasons. The seventeenth season, which premiered on June 7, 2021, while the eighteenth season premiered on October 19, 2021. The nineteenth season, which premiered on July 11, 2022.

Series overview

Episodes

Season 1 (2003)

Season 2 (2004)

Season 3 (2005)

Season 4 (2008)

Season 5 (2009)

Season 6 (2010)

Season 7 (2011)

Season 8 (2012)

Season 9 (2013)

Season 10 (2014)

Season 11 (2015)

Season 12 (2016)

Season 13 (2017)

Season 14 (2018)

Season 15 (2019)

Season 16 (2020)

Season 17 (2021)

Season 18 (2021)

Season 19 (2022)

Specials

Notes and references
Notes

Specific

External links
 
 

Episodes
Lists of American reality television series episodes